Joan Francesc Mira i Casterà (born December 3, 1939 in Valencia, Spain) is a Spanish writer, anthropologist and sociologist. He is an honorary member of the Associació d'Escriptors en Llengua Catalana and President of Acció Cultural del País Valencià. In politics he is a supporter and has been a candidate of Valencian Nationalist Bloc in 2000 and 2003.

Around the valencianist and historical theme, his works include Crítica de la Nació Pura (1985), which he discusses the concept of nation, Sobre la nació dels valencians (1997) and Els Borja, família i mite ("The Borgia: family and myth", 2000).

Biography 
In 1959 he obtained a bachelor's degree in Pontifical Gregorian University, and the following year, also in Rome, he graduated in philosophy by Lateran University. In 1962 he graduated in Philosophy from the University of Valencia and he reached his PhD in Philosophy from the same university in 1971. He later worked as a professor of Ancient Greek language in 1983 and 1991, when he reached the chair of this language in the Jaume I University where he developed his teaching. In 1991 he received the Creu de Sant Jordi Award for his civic engagement. Also in 1999 became a member of the Institute of Catalan Studies.

During the seventies he collaborates in the  Laboratoire d'Anthropologie Sociale from Sorbonne, and in 1978+1979 he was lecturer at the Princeton University. He directed the Valencian Institute of Sociology and Social Anthropology between 1980 and 1984, and in 1982 he founded the Museum of Ethnology in Valencia, institution that he directed until 1984.

He is also author of novels and short stories as El bou de foc (1974), Els cucs de seda (1975), Viatge al final del fred (1984), Els treballs perduts (1989) – Lectors del Temps Award, 1990 and a thematic approach to Ulysses from Joyce-, Borja Papa (1996), Quatre qüestions d'amor (1998) and Purgatori (2002).

As a translator, include versions of  The Divine Comedy  (2001), the Gospel (2004) and the Odyssey (2011)

In 2009 he was awarded the Premi de la Crítica de narrativa catalana 2008 for his work El professor d'historia.

Works

Novels 
El bou de foc (1974) 
Els cucs de seda (1975) 
El desig dels dies (1981) 
Viatge al final del fred (1983) 
El treballs perduts (1989) 
Borja Papa (1996) 
Purgatori (2002) 
El professor d'història (2008)
 El tramvia groc (2013)

Short stories 
Quatre qüestions d'amor (1998) 
Els cucs de seda (1975)

Essays, studies, biographies 
Som. Llengua i Literatura (1974) 
Un estudi d'antropologia social al País Valencià: els pobles de Vallalta i Miralcamp (1974)
Els valencians i la terra (1978) 
Introducció a un País (1980) 
Població i llengua al País Valencià (1981)
Crítica de la nació pura (1985) 
Hèrcules i l'antropòleg (1994)
Sense música ni pàtria (1995) 
Sobre la nació dels valencians (1997)
Cap d'any a Houston (1998)
Els Borja. Família i mite (2000)
Sant Vicent Ferrer. Vida i llegenda d'un predicador (2002)
La prodigiosa història de Vicent Blasco Ibáñez (2004)
Vida i final dels moriscos valencians (2009)
En un món fet de nacions (2008) 
Europeus. Retrat en setanta imatges (2010)

Translations 
Borja Papa (1997)
Valencia para visitantes y vecinos (1999)
Los Borja: familia y mito (2000)
El tramvia (2001), from Claude Simon
La divina comèdia (2001)
Evangelis (2004)
l'Odissea (2011)

Notes

External links 
Joan F. Mira at the website of Associació d'Escriptors en Llengua Catalana (AELC)

Living people
Catalan-language writers
1939 births
Pontifical Gregorian University alumni
Pontifical Lateran University alumni
University of Valencia alumni